Act 4 is an album by the progressive bluegrass Maryland band The Seldom Scene, the first record under Sugar Hill Records and with a new lead singer/guitarist, Phil Rosenthal. He replaced John Starling, who left to concentrate on his career.

Track listing 
 "Something in the Wind" (Phil Rosenthal, Beth Rosenthal) – 03:15
 "Girl in the Night" (Hank Thompson) – 03:51
 "Ride Me Down Easy" (Billy Joe Shaver) – 02:25
 "Leaving Harlan" (Phil Rosenthal) – 03:00
 "Tennessee Blues" (Bill Monroe) – 03:14
 "Life Is Like a Mountain Railway" (Traditional; arranged by John Duffey and Mike Auldridge) – 03:37
 "I Don't Know You" (Moreno, Black) – 02:38
 "California Blues" (Jimmie Rodgers) – 03:53
 "San Antonio Rose" (Bob Wills) – 02:29
 "Daddy Was a Railroad Man" (Phil Rosenthal) – 02:29
 "Walking the Blues" (Tom Gray) – 03:59
 "This Weary Heart You Stole Away" (Carter Stanley) – 02:39

Personnel 
The Seldom Scene
 Phil Rosenthal – vocals, guitar
 John Duffey – mandolin, vocals
 Ben Eldridge – banjo, guitar, vocals
 Mike Auldridge – Dobro, guitar, vocals
 Tom Gray – bass, vocals

References

External links 
 Official site

1979 albums
The Seldom Scene albums
Sugar Hill Records albums